Lifestylez ov da Poor & Dangerous is the debut studio album by American rapper Big L, and the only to be released during his lifetime. It was released on March 28, 1995 by Columbia Records. Recording sessions took place primarily at Powerplay Studios in Queens, New York in mid-to-late 1994. Production was handled by Buckwild, Lord Finesse, Showbiz and Craig Boogie.

The album debuted at number 149 on the US Billboard 200 and number 22 on R&B/Hip-Hop Albums, but did not chart internationally. Lifestylez ov da Poor & Dangerous spawned three singles: "Put It On", "M.V.P.", and "No Endz, No Skinz", the first two both peaked within the top 25 on the US Hot Rap Tracks and Hot Dance Singles Sales. Upon its release, the album received positive reviews from music critics, earning praise for Big L's lyricism and wordplay, and is now considered by many fans as a classic album. As of August 2000, the album had sold 200,000 copies, according to Nielsen SoundScan.

Background 
Big L began writing rhymes in 1990 and his first professional appearance came on the B-side of "Party Over Here" by Lord Finesse in 1992. Around this time, L joined Lord Finesse's Bronx-based hip hop group Diggin' in the Crates Crew (D.I.T.C.).  The group consisted of Lord Finesse, Diamond D, O.C., Fat Joe, Buckwild, Showbiz and A.G. He founded Harlem centered rap group Children of the Corn with fellow aspiring MC's Killa Cam, Murda Mase, Bloodshed and Herb McGruff; when Bloodshed died in a car accident in 1997, the group later disbanded.

In 1993, Big L submitted a four track cassette tape to Columbia Records, who soon after signed him to their company. The album title is a play on the 1984-95 Television series, Lifestyles of the Rich and Famous.

Recording and production 
Recording for Lifestylez ov da Poor & Dangerous mainly took place at Powerplay Studios (Queens, New York); the songs "Put It On" and "Danger Zone" were recorded at Unique Studios (New York City, New York) and the songs "M.V.P." and "Street Struck" were recorded at Chung King Studios (New York City, New York). James Niedermeyer worked with Big L on the album and heavily influenced the lyrics on songs such as "Danger Zone" and "All Black".

Lifestylez ov da Poor & Dangerous was produced by mainly members of Big L's group, Diggin' in the Crates Crew: Buckwild, Lord Finesse (who produced most of the album), and Showbiz. Craig Boogie as well as Kid Capri (who was often referred to as an honorary member of D.I.T.C.) also helped with the production of the album.  The album also features guest appearances from a young Cam'ron (credited as Killa Cam on "8 Iz Enuff") and Jay-Z (on "Da Graveyard").

Composition 
In a 2010 interview with HipHopDX to commemorate the album's 15th anniversary and its re-issue by Traffic Entertainment, Lord Finesse discussed the making of the album.

Concerning "Put It On", he stated: 
[Columbia Records] wanted something with a hook that would be kinda catchy, and something they could get radio play with. Horror-core. So they needed something bright, something friendly. And "Put It On" just matched everything perfect."

Concerning "M.V.P.", he stated:
That song came about because L wanted a commercial, R&B loop that everybody could recognize. And me remembering that [DeBarge] record, and also remembering how Kid Capri used it way back when he did – I forgot which record he did, but he had that [song], and I’m like, "Damn, well maybe we could reinvent that right there." And L heard the loop and was like, "Yeah, that’s it!" But, [with] Diggin’, we had to have the right drums, the right everything [to go with a sample], and we dressed it up in a way where we tried to keep it Hip Hop.

Concerning "8 Iz Enuff", he said:
With that [song] L just thought he had to do a track with the rappers from his hood. And he definitely wanted to put on [those particular emcees]… We looking like, "How you gonna put eight niggas on one track?" [And he was like], "Don’t worry, I got this."

Speaking about "Danger Zone", he said:
At the time it was somebody by the name of David Kahne [working as L’s A&R at Columbia]. He was like the person who was responsible for getting L signed, and he loved all that devil’s son shit. [Says in nasally white-guy voice] "Oh wow, this is great!" It’s like, "Are you serious?" Because we had to make [L] change a line in "Devil’s Son" because it was [like], "You’re too out-of-order." What was the line . . . "I’m killin’ chumps for the cheapest price / I’m rollin’ with Satan," [and instead of then saying "not Jesus Christ"] it was "F Jesus Christ." But we made him change it to "Not Jesus Christ." [We were] like, "Yo, what the fuck are you doing?!"

Commenting on "Street Struck", he said:
That was Sony [that wanted him to make something more positive]. [They were like], "You so dark on this album, we need something positive we can push. This album is too dark: you got "All Black", you got "Danger Zone", you done came out with "Devil’s Son". We really don’t wanna push that as your image. You have to do something that’s gonna balance it." And that’s [when] we started doing more conceptual, conscious songs like "Fed Up Wit The Bullshit", "Street Struck", and "M.V.P." and "Put It On."

Release and promotion 
Lifestylez ov da Poor & Dangerous was released on March 28, 1995. Prior to the release, Big L, under Columbia, released a promotional cassette tape in 1994 consisting of four tracks that did not make it to the final album.

Singles 
Lifestylez ov da Poor & Dangerous released three singles, all of which peaked within the top 25 on Billboard'''s Hot Rap Tracks and Hot Dance Singles Sales. The first single to release was "Put It On." It peaked at number 12 on Hot Dance Singles Sales, 23 on Hot Rap Tracks, and 81 on Hot R&B/Hip-Hop Songs. The second single to be released was "M.V.P.", which peaked at number 15 on Hot Rap Tracks, 25 on Hot Dance Singles Sales, and 56 on Hot R&B/Hip-Hop Songs. The third and final single from the album was "No Endz, No Skinz", however, the song did not chart. In addition to the three singles, "Street Struck" was released as a promotional single, but did not chart as well.

 Reception 

 Commercial performance Lifestylez ov da Poor & Dangerous debuted at number 149 on the US Billboard 200 and number 22 on the US R&B/Hip-Hop Albums. The album would not peak any higher. It has sold over 200,000 copies since August 2000.

 Critical response Lifestylez ov da Poor & Dangerous received critical acclaim. The Source wrote that "[Big L] comes with ill animated lyrics, combined with metaphors that stun; a combo sure to have suckas on the run".

M. F. DiBella of AllMusic complimented Big L as "a master of the lyrical stickup undressing his competition with kinetic metaphors and a brash comedic repertoire," while noting: "With better production and marketing, Big L might have found himself with a platinum album but instead he settled for platinum respect."

Steve Juon of RapReviews called the album "jam packed with treats" and lamented that it "faded quietly into obscurity, now better known after his death than it was while he was still alive".

Track listing

Early configurations
A promotional cassette circulated in 1994 with a different track listing, including four songs that did not make the final retail album. A later promotional cassette also included an extra track that was removed from the final track listing.

Personnel
Credits for Lifestylez of da Poor & Dangerous'' adapted from Allmusic.

 Buckwild – producer
 Dino Zervous – engineer
 Big L – vocals
 Craig Boogie – producer
 Mike Boogie – vocals
 Buddah Bless – vocals
 Herb McGruff – vocals
 Showbiz – producer
 Trooper J – vocals
 Big Twan – vocals
 Grand Daddy I.U. - vocals
 Jay-Z – vocals
 Tony Dawsey – mastering
 Danny Clinch – photography
 Michelle Willems – art direction, design
 Killa Kam – vocals
 John Shriver – engineer
 Party Arty – vocals
 Terra – vocals
 Kid Capri – vocals, producer
 Chris Conway – engineer
 Lord Finesse – vocals, producer
 Microphone Nut – Vocals

Charts

Release history

References

External links

1995 debut albums
Big L albums
Horrorcore albums
Gangsta rap albums by American artists
Albums produced by Lord Finesse
Albums produced by Showbiz (producer)
Albums produced by Buckwild
Albums recorded at Chung King Studios